39 Service Battalion (39 Svc Bn) is a Canadian Army Primary Reserve combat service support unit  of the Canadian Forces that can fight in a defensive role and provides both logistical and army engineering maintenance support to the units within 3rd Canadian Division's 39 Canadian Brigade Group, which consists of all Primary Reserve army units in British Columbia.

History
Prior to 2010, 39 Canadian Brigade Group (39 CBG), which is the headquarters responsible for all Primary Reserve army units in British Columbia, had two individual service battalions under its chain of command. The two individual service battalions were 11 (Victoria) Service Battalion and 12 (Vancouver) Service Battalion.

In 2010, the two individual service battalions in 39 Canadian Brigade Group were amalgamated into the two companies that make up the new 39 Service Battalion.

Current structure
39 Service Battalion is composed of four companies.

Administration Company in Richmond
11 (Victoria) Company (11 Coy) in Victoria, British Columbia
12 (Vancouver) Company (12 Coy) in Richmond, with a detachment at Chilliwack, British Columbia
Technical Services Company (Tech Svcs Coy) in Richmond, with a detachment at Chilliwack

See also
Royal Canadian Logistics Service
Corps of Royal Canadian Electrical and Mechanical Engineers

External links
 

039 Service Battalion
039 Service Battalion
Richmond, British Columbia
Military units and formations established in 2010